The Second Drees cabinet, also called the Third Drees cabinet was the executive branch of the Dutch Government from 2 September 1952 until 13 October 1956. The cabinet was formed by the social-democratic Labour Party (PvdA) and the christian-democratic Catholic People's Party (KVP), Anti-Revolutionary Party (ARP) and Christian Historical Union (CHU) after the election of 1952. The cabinet was a centrist grand coalition and had a majority in the House of Representatives with Labour Leader Willem Drees serving as Prime Minister. Former Catholic Prime Minister Louis Beel served as Deputy Prime Minister and Minister of the Interior.

The cabinet served during early years of the turbulent 1950s. Domestically the recovery and rebuilding following World War II continued with the assistance of the Marshall Plan, it also able to finalize several major social reforms to social security, welfare, child benefits and education from the previous cabinet. Internationally the decolonization of the Dutch East Indies following the Indonesian National Revolution continued. The cabinet suffered no major internal and external conflicts and completed its entire term and was succeeded by the Third Drees cabinet following the election of 1956.

Term
The economic recovery after World War II continued. This made further expansion of social security possible, of which the best example is the institution of the state pension AOW in 1956. Also, a major housing scheme was executed, building 80 000 houses per year.

A major setback was the North Sea flood of 1953, which resulted in damage equivalent to 5% of the GDP. An emergency law was made to recover the dykes and plans were made for the Delta Works, the world's largest flood protection project, which should protect the South West Netherlands against another such combination of storm and spring tide.

An episcopal 'mandement' called for Catholics to give up their PvdA-membership, but without result.

The 29 December 1952 Statute for the kingdom granted Surinam and the Netherlands Antilles a certain degree of independence within the kingdom.

In 1955 the labour ban on married women was abolished, following the "motion Tendeloo", named after PvdA's member of parliament Corry Tendeloo. This ban meant that state employers had to fire their female employees once they married.

On 15 February 1956 the Dutch-Indonesian Union officially ended. Relationships between the two countries continued to deteriorate.

When the PvdA voted with the opposition over a combined law to lower taxes and raise rents on 17 May 1955, this led to a crisis. The cabinet fell, but returned after 17 days when PvdA chairman Burger had reconciled the parties.

Cabinet Members

Trivia
 Nine cabinet members had previous experience as scholars and professors: Louis Beel (Administrative Law), Julius Christiaan van Oven (Roman Law), Jelle Zijlstra (Public Economics), Willem Kernkamp (Constitutional and Administrative Law and Arabic Literature), Willem Hendrik van den Berge (Public Economics), Gerard Veldkamp (Microeconomics), Piet Muntendam (Social Medicine), Aat van Rhijn (Fiscal Law) and Anna de Waal (Geography).
 Four cabinet members (later) served as Prime Minister: Willem Drees (1948–1958), Louis Beel (1946–1948) (1958–1959), Jelle Zijlstra (1966–1967) and Jo Cals (1965–1966).
 Four cabinet members would later be granted the honorary title of Minister of State: Willem Drees (1958), Louis Beel (1956), Jelle Zijlstra (1983) and Jo Cals (1966).
 Two cabinet members Johan Beyen and Sicco Mansholt are considered Founding fathers of the European Union.
 Had both the oldest and youngest cabinet members in Dutch History when they took office: Julius Christiaan van Oven was  years old and Gerard Veldkamp was  years old.
 Anna de Waal was the first female cabinet member in Dutch History.

References

External links
Official

  Kabinet-Drees III Parlement & Politiek
  Kabinet-Drees II Rijksoverheid

Cabinets of the Netherlands
1952 establishments in the Netherlands
1956 disestablishments in the Netherlands
Cabinets established in 1952
Cabinets disestablished in 1956
Grand coalition governments